Hectorite is a rare soft, greasy, white clay mineral with a chemical formula of .

Hectorite was first described in 1941 and named for an occurrence in the United States near Hector (in San Bernardino County, California, 30 miles east of Barstow.) Hectorite occurs with bentonite as an alteration product of clinoptilolite from volcanic ash and tuff with a high glass content.  Hectorite is also found in the beige/brown clay ghassoul, mined in the Atlas Mountains in Morocco.  A large deposit of hectorite is also found at the Thacker Pass lithium deposit, located within the McDermitt Caldera in Nevada.  The Thacker Pass lithium deposit could be a significant source of lithium.

Despite its rarity, it is economically viable as the Hector mine sits over a large deposit of the mineral. Hectorite is mostly used in making cosmetics, but has uses in chemical and other industrial applications, and is a mineral source for refined lithium metal.

See also
 Classification of minerals
 List of minerals

References

Smectite group
Monoclinic minerals
Minerals in space group 12
Lithium minerals
Magnesium minerals
Sodium minerals
Minerals described in 1941